KPK may refer to:

 Khyber Pakhtunkhwa, a province of Pakistan
 Komisi Pemberantasan Korupsi (Corruption Eradication Commission), Indonesia
 Komisija za preprečevanje korupcije (Commission for the Prevention of Corruption), Slovenia
 Canadian Polish Congress, Kongres Polonii Kanadyjskiej (KPK)